Shynkarenko or Shinkarenko is a Ukrainian surname. It is an occupational surname of patronymic derivation, based on the occupation of shynkar (шинкар), or 'saloon keeper' and literally meaning "child of saloon keeper". Other Ukrainian surnames of similar derivation are Shynkar and Shynkaruk.

It may refer to the following people:
Alina Shynkarenko (born 1998), Ukrainian synchronised swimmer
Dmytro Shynkarenko (born 2000), Ukrainian football player
Igor Shinkarenko (born 1956), Russian football player and manager 
Tetyana Shynkarenko (born 1978), Ukrainian handball player
Viktoriia Shynkarenko (born 1995), Ukrainian rhythmic gymnast
Vladyslav Shynkarenko (born 2001), Ukrainian football player

See also
 

Occupational surnames
Patronymic surnames
Ukrainian-language surnames
Surnames of Ukrainian origin